The Kharkiv University or Karazin University, or officially V. N. Karazin Kharkiv National University, is one of the major universities in Ukraine, and earlier in the Russian Empire and Soviet Union. It was founded in 1804 through the efforts of Vasily Karazin becoming the second oldest university in modern-day Ukraine.

History

Russian Empire

On , the Decree on the Opening of the Imperial University in Kharkiv came into force. The university became the second university in the south of the Russian Empire. It was founded on the initiative of the local community with Vasily Karazin at the fore, whose idea was supported by the nobility and the local authorities. Count Seweryn Potocki was appointed the first supervisor of the university, the first rector being the philologist and philosopher Ivan Rizhsky.

In 1811, the Philotechnical Society was founded, while the Mathematical Society of Kharkiv, the Historical and Philological Society of Kharkiv, the Naturalists Society, Societies of Physics, Chemistry, Law, among others, were established in the second half of the 19th century. The first periodicals in Slobozhanshchyna appear in the university around this time, including Kharkovski Ezhenedelnik (1812), Ukrainski Vestnik (1816–1819), Ukrainski Zhurnal (1824–1825), etc.

In 1839, a veterinary school, which in 1851 became an independent institute, was established at the university. By this time, the campus included laboratories, clinics, an astronomical observatory, a botanical garden and a library.

Previously, the university was autonomous with rectors being elected. However, from 1820 to 1850, all its activity was strictly controlled. Rectors were appointed by the Minister of Education, while scientific publications and academic processes were censored.

In 1863, under a new Statute, the university became partly autonomous.

The university has been publishing Scientific Notes since 1874.

From the 19th century up to the early 20th century, the University of Kharkiv had four schools: School of Physics and Mathematics, School of History and Philology, School of Medicine, School of Law.

The university exerted great influence on school-life in Slobozhanshchyna in the first period of its existence, largely from 1805 to 1835.

Ukrainian SSR
From 1917 to 1920, there was a struggle between advocates of the Ukrainian statehood and Russian course. Some of the professors who opposed new political realities left. Most of the Ukrainian professors remained in Kharkiv. They continued working in the institutions founded by the Soviet government: the Academy of Theoretical Knowledge (1920–1921), Kharkiv Institute of Public Education (KhIPE, 1921–1930), Kharkiv Institute of National Economy, Institute of Physics and Chemistry, and Institute of Law. Kharkiv State University, consisting of seven schools —  School of Physics and Mathematics, School of Chemistry, School of Biology, School of Geology and Geography, School of Literature and Linguistics (with Department of Philosophy), and School of Economy (with Department of Economic Geography) — was restored on their basis in 1932–1933.

In 1921, Kharkiv Medical Institute was founded based on the School of Medicine of the University of Kharkiv.

In 1936, the university was named after the late Russian writer Maxim Gorky (though he was not related to the university during his life). During the German-Soviet war, it was evacuated to the city of Kizilord in Kazakhstan, where it merged with the Kyiv University to form the United Ukrainian State University. In 1943/44, the university returned to Kharkiv (the first academic year after the liberation of the city on November 1, 1943). In 1951, 800 university students suffered from persecution after they refused to pass exams in Russian. Court trials were held behind closed doors.

In 1977, the following schools were operating in the university: School of Mechanics and Mathematics, School of Physics, School of Geology and Geography, School of Economy, School of History, School of Philology, School of Foreign Languages, School of General Sciences, School of Correspondence Learning, and Night School.

Independent Ukraine

On 11 October 1999, Leonid Kuchma, the President of Ukraine issued a decree, in which he, "taking into consideration considerable contribution that Kharkiv State University made to training qualified specialists and to development of science" granted the status of a national university and named it after its founder, Vasyl Karazin.

In 2004, the university was given a twin building (the former Govorov Academy), opposite Svobody Square.

In 2022, the university was severely damaged by Russia's invasion of Ukraine. On March 2, the Russian shelling hit the building of the Faculty of Economics and was subsequently destroyed by Russian shelling. On March 5 the university sports complex was partially destroyed. On March 11 — the building of the Faculty of Physics and Technology was partially destroyed and on March 18 — the Institute of Public Administration was partially ruined. As of March 22, according to the university's press service, the University had no intact buildings left.

Campuses and buildings

Main building
Northern building 
Central Scientific Library
Students’ Campus

Ranking

Under the Soviet Union, the University of Kharkiv was decorated the Order of the Red Banner of Labour, the Order of the October Revolution and the Order of Peoples' Friendship.

Kharkiv National University holds the second place in Ukraine in volume of publications and citations in scientific database Scopus and the Hirsch index, with the best academic results in the School of Medicine and School of Biology.

In 2021, according to QS World University Rankings, it is the best university in Ukraine and ranks 477th university in the world.

Units

Departments
 School of Biology
 School of Chemistry
 School of Computer Sciences
 School of Ecology
 School of Economics
 School of International Economic Relations and Tourism
 School of Foreign Languages
School of Medicine
 School of Geology and Geography
 School of History
 School Mechanics and Mathematics
 School of Law
 School of Physics
 School of Philology
 School of Philosophy
 School of Psychology
 School of Physics and Energy
 School of Radiophysics
 School of Sociology

Institute of High Technologies
 School of Physics and Technology
 School of Computer Science
 School of Energy Physics

Scientific institutions
 Kharkiv University History Museum
 State Natural History Museum of National University of Kharkiv
 The Museum of Archaeology

Notable alumni and professors

Nobel prize winners
 Élie Metchnikoff (Medicine, 1908)
 Lev Landau (Physics, 1962)
 Simon Kuznets (Economic Sciences, 1971)

Others
 Józef Piłsudski, Chief of State of Poland, first Marshal of Poland
 Boris Gourevitch, author, activist 
 Roza Sarkisyan, theatre director
 Sergiy Vilkomir, computer scientist
 Marta Fiedina, synchro swimmer
 Maria Burmaka, singer, musician
 Anton Korobov, chess Grandmaster

See also
 Open access in Ukraine
 List of modern universities in Europe (1801–1945)

References

External links

 Official Website 
 University of Kharkiv at Encyclopedia of Ukraine
 University Library 

 
Educational institutions established in 1804
1804 establishments in Ukraine
National universities in Ukraine
Buildings and structures destroyed during the 2022 Russian invasion of Ukraine